The 2021 mayoral election in Jackson, Mississippi took place on June 8, 2021, alongside other Jackson municipal races. Incumbent mayor Chokwe Antar Lumumba was re-elected to a second term in office. Primary elections took place on April 6. The deadline to register to vote in the party primaries was March 8.

Democratic primary

Candidates

Qualified
Chokwe Antar Lumumba, incumbent mayor
Patty Patterson, entrepreneur, candidate for mayor in 2013, and candidate for the Mississippi House of Representatives in 2015
Kenneth Wilson, former firefighter

Disqualified
Gwen Ward Chapman, Independent candidate for mayor in 2017

Endorsements

Results

Republican primary

Candidates

Qualified
Ponto Downing, activist and perennial candidate
Jason Wells, police officer and nominee for mayor in 2017

Results

Independents

Qualified
Shafeqah BigMama Lodree, entrepreneur,  businesswoman, owner BigMama's Bail Bonding
Charlotte Reeves, businesswoman and perennial candidate
Les Tannehill, former Hinds County sheriff's deputy and candidate for Hinds County Sheriff in 2015

General election

Results

References

External links
Official campaign websites
 Shafeqah BigMama Lodree (I) for Mayor 
 Chokwe Antar Lumumba (D) for Mayor
 Les Tannehill (I) for Mayor

2021 United States mayoral elections
Mayoral elections in Jackson, Mississippi